The United States Ambassador to Mali is the official representative of the government of the United States to the government of Mali.

Ambassadors
Thomas Kenneth Wright (1960-1961)
William Jules Handley (1961-1964)
Charles Robert Moore (1965-1968)
Gilbert Edward Clark (1968-1970)
Robert O. Blake – Career FSO
Appointed: December 10, 1970
Terminated mission: May 20, 1973
Patricia M. Byrne – Career FSO
Appointed: 1976
Terminated mission: 1979
Anne Forrester – Career FSO
Appointed: 1979
Terminated mission: 1981
Parker W. Borg – Career FSO
Appointed: 1981
Terminated mission: 1984
Robert Joseph Ryan (1984-1987)
Robert Maxwell Pringle (1987-1990)
Herbert Donald Gelber (1990-1993)
William H. Dameron (1993-1995)
David P. Rawson (1996-1999)
Michael Edward Ranneberger (1999-2002)
Vicki J. Huddleston (2002-2005)
Terence Patrick McCulley (2005-2008)
Gillian Milovanovic – Career FSO
Appointed: September 26, 2008
Terminated mission: June 1, 2011
Mary Beth Leonard – Career FSO
Appointed: November 7, 2011
Terminated mission: September 22, 2014
Paul Folmsbee – Career FSO
Appointed: May 23, 2015
Terminated mission: January 2, 2019
Dennis B. Hankins – Career FSO
Appointed: March 15, 2019
Terminated mission: September 26, 2022
Rachna Korhonen – Career FSO
Appointed: March 16, 2023
Terminated mission: Incumbent

See also
Mali - United States relations
Foreign relations of Mali
Ambassadors of the United States

References

United States Department of State: Background notes on Mali

External links
 United States Department of State: Chiefs of Mission for Mali
 United States Department of State: Mali
 United States Embassy in Bamako

Mali
United States